Coleophora decipiens is a moth of the family Coleophoridae. It is found in Mexico.

References

decipiens
Moths described in 1914
Moths of Central America